Nellyville is an American reality television series which airs on BET. The series debuted on November 25, 2014, and chronicles the life of American rapper Nelly and his family.

Episodes

Season 1 (2014-15)

Season 2 (2015)

References

2010s American reality television series
2014 American television series debuts
2015 American television series endings
African-American reality television series
BET original programming